Vince Mangold (born July 22, 1964) is an American politician who has served in the Mississippi House of Representatives from the 53rd district since 2016.

References

1964 births
Living people
Republican Party members of the Mississippi House of Representatives
21st-century American politicians